Maraka (Sanskrit: मारक) in Hindu astrology refers to the planet or planets that cause death at the end of a particular life-span; if the assessed life-span is not over they cause accident, ill-health, poverty and misery during the course of their dasha or antra-dasha or in the period of the planet associating/influenced by them. Each lagna has a fixed maraka or marakas. The two luminaries, the Sun and the Moon, and the lord of the 9th house generally do not become marakas. The lords of the 2nd and the 7th house, or the malefic planets occupying anyone of these named houses and associated with their lords are the Primary determinants of death. The Secondary determinants of death are the benefic planets in association with lords of 2nd and 7th house or the lords of the 3rd and 8th house, or the lord of the 3rd or the 8th associating with the lord of the 2nd or the 7th house. The Tertiary determinants of death are Saturn associating with any of the afore stated marakas, the lord of the 6th or the 8th associated with a maraka, and the least powerful planet in the horoscope. The transit influences of the Sun, Mars and Jupiter are taken into account for determining the time of death.

Longevity

The results of the good and the bad karmas collected by man between intervals of births become known in this birth, and the pattern of life the aggregate of man’s karma shape are comprehended with the aid of Jyotisha. For the purpose of ascertaining the possible span of life the Amsayu method should be adopted if at the time of birth the Lagna is vested with strength; the Pindayu method, if the Sun is strong, and the Nisargayu method, if the Moon is strong. If at the time of birth the lord of the 8th house counted from the lagna happens to occupy a kendrasthana the person will be long-lived; if the lord of the 8th house or the lord of the lagna is in the 8th house afflicted by inauspicious planets the person will be short-lived.

The use of Nisargayu, the Pindayu, the Lagnayu, the Amsayu, the Rashmiayu, the Chakrayu, the Nakshatrayu and the Ashtakavargayu methods are employed for determining longevity, but longevity is determined on the basis of the strength of the horoscope in its entirety, and the dasa of planets. The planets most afflicted by maraka-propensities by aspect, association or occupation are cause of death, death indicated on the basis of transits can occur only when the directional influences in the birth-chart warrant. The ordinary span of man’s life rarely exceeds one hundred years. Parasara has on a very broad basis classified three categories of life-spans – Alpayu up to thirty-two years, Madhyayu beyond thirty-two years but less than seventy-one years, and Poornayu beyond seventy years up to the maximum of one hundred twenty years. Diseases alone are not the cause of all deaths, but diseases resulting from bad karmas cannot be cured. The grant of term of life depends on Bhagya (luck), and a person not blessed with good health does not enjoy to any extent his granted term of life.

Planets causing death

The moment of death is indicated by the Chhidra grahas; the Chhidra grahas are a) the lord of the 8th    house, b) the planet in the 8th house, c) the planet aspecting the 8th house, d) the lord of the 22nd drekkana from the lagna, e) the planet in conjunction with the lord of the 8th house, f) the lord of the 64th navamsa from the Moon and g) the Atisatru (the bitter enemy) to the lord of the 8th house.

Vaidyanatha Dikshita, in his Jataka Parijata, takes note of six Arishta- dashas – even one papagraha devoid of strength and benefic influence indicates death during the course of its dasha in the period corresponding with the mandala occupied by it, the dasha of the planet in rasi-sandhi brings illness and disease, a person suffers set-backs and reverses in the antra-dasha of the planet situated in the 6th or the 8th house from the lagna in a sign owned by a papagraha, death occurs during the course of the 5th dasha of Mars or Rahu, or the 6th dasha of Jupiter or the 4th dasha of Saturn or the dasha of the debilitated planet occupying an inimical sign or occupying Vipata, Nidhana or Pratyari nakshatra, the person suffers loss of things indicated by the planet situated or aspecting the 2nd or the 7th during the antra-dashas of the lords of the 2nd and the 7th ; death is likely to occur when the lord of the sign occupied by the lord of the drekkena  falling in the 8th house or its dispositor, transit the navamsa occupied by them. He also takes note of the dasha or antra-dasha of the weakest Chhidra-graha (छिद्र ग्रह) during which period death is likely; the lord of the 8th, the planet situated in the 8th, the planet aspecting the 8th house, the lord of the 22nd drekkena, the planet combining with the lord of the 8th, the lord of the 64th navamsa counted from that occupied by the Moon and its bitter foe are the seven Chhidra-grahas.

The lords of 2nd and the 12th house cause death; the malefic planet situated in the 2nd house is stronger than the lord of that house, and the malefic planet in conjunction with the lord of the 2nd house, who also has the powers of the 12th house lord, is stronger than the malefic planet which happens to be in the 2nd. The 7th house lord becomes a stronger maraka if it also owns a trika-bhava (the 6th, the 8th or the 12th house counted from the lagna), malefic planets acquire the power to kill when associated with the 8th, 2nd or 7th house or their lords, the dashas of the marakas (lords of 2nd, 7th, 6th and 12th) can bring about death, lord of 12th and planet in the 12th bring about death when all else has failed.  When Saturn is malefic and is associated with planets causing death or with the lord of the 3rd or the 11th house then Saturn becomes the prime effective maraka to cause death. Saturn situated in the 6th house prolongs life. Death can occur in the dasha of a weak benefic planet occupying the 8th house or the lord of the lagna can give yoga and kill the native. Venkateswara, the author of Jataka Chandrika, also states that in the antra-dasha of a maraka in the dasha of a Raja yoga-karaka, Raja yoga effects will be experienced but the same will break in the antra-dasha of a malefic planet; that the benefic associated with a maraka does not kill but a malefic can.  If the lagna is strong Amsayurdaya method is to be applied for calculating longevity, but if the Moon is strong then it is the Naisargika Ayurdaya method that is required to be applied.

Marakas & Marakasthanas

The 8th house from the lagna is the house of longevity; the 8th house counted from the 8th i.e. the 3rd house, is also the house of longevity. The 12th house counted from the 3rd and the 8th i.e. the 2nd and the 7th houses from the lagna, are the marakasthanas (the death-inflicting houses), and the lords of the 2nd and the 7th are designated as the principal Marakas (the inflictors of death or the killers).

Effect

Maraka means the one that causes death at the end of a life-span or causes ill-health. The maraka for Aries lagna is Venus for it owns both marakasthanas; Mars, Moon, Venus and Jupiter are the marakas for Taurus lagna; the Moon for Gemini lagna; Saturn for Cancer and Leo lagnas; Venus for Virgo lagna; Mars for Libra lagna; Venus for Scorpio lagna; Venus and Saturn for Sagittarius lagna; Mars, Moon and Jupiter for Capricorn lagna; the Sun, Mars and Jupiter for Aquarius lagna, and for Pisces lagna, Mercury and Saturn are the designated marakas. The marakas and the planets associated with the marakas, and all malefic planets can cause illness and death during the operation of their dashas but if longevity is over but the dasa of maraka is not operating then the lord of the 12th house acts as the maraka and its dasha or the dasha of a malefic can cause death. Saturn and Rahu are the Mrityu-karakas or significators of death. A Maraka does not kill in its own antra-dasha in the dasa of a benefic planet but it does so in its antra-dasha the dasha of a malefic. Saturn associated with a maraka kills, and death generally occurs during the course of the antra-dasha of the lords of the trikabhavas in the dasha of a maraka. The lords of the 2nd and the 12th bhavas counted from the sign and bhava occupied by the Moon behave as marakas if they are natural malefic. Moreover, death can occur in the antra-dasha or dasha of the lord of the 3rd nakshatra from Janam nakshatra (asterism occupied by the Moon at birth) for a person of Alpayu (short-life), in that of the 5th nakshatra for a person of Madhyayu (Middle-life) and in that of the 7th nakshatra for a person blessed with Poornayu (long-life).

The manner of death can be known from the yoga-formations occurring at the time of birth, e.g. if the Sun combines with Saturn and Rahu in the 7th house the person will be bitten by a cobra or if the Sun and Mars are in the 4th house aspected by or in conjunction with the lord of the 4th and the 10th, the person will be stoned to death or die by falling on a stone or by a falling stone. Death from punishment by ruler can occur if the Sun is in the 3rd or is influencing the lord of the 3rd house or by fire if it in the 8th or influencing the 8th house; similarly the Moon can cause death either by Tuberculosis or from excess fluids (or drowning); Mars from either a surgical operation, burns, injuries or from weapon or surgery; Mercury from either Febrile, illness, or from fever; Jupiter from either Tumours, swelling or from prolonged illness; Venus from either Diabetes or renal disease or from starvation; and Saturn and Rahu from poison, drowning, fall from height, injury, incarceration or from thirst or dehydration. Natural malefics cause illness or death in their dasha or antradasha; disease is possible in the body that is susceptible to diseases; a strong lagna and the strong lord of the lagna, and the natural benefics in the kendras prevent early or pre-mature death caused by illness or disease.

Following are the marakas in their descending order of strength –
a)	The malefic planet (as per Parasari qualification) in sambandha (association) with the lord of a marakasthana,
b)	The malefic planet in sambandha with lord of the 7th situated in the 2nd or the 7th house
c)	Lord of the 2nd house
d)	Lord of the 7th house
e)	Malefic planet in the 2nd house
f)	Malefic planet in the 7th house
g)	Natural benefic planet owning two kendras associated and with a maraka
h)	Rahu or Ketu in the 2nd or the 7th house combining with a maraka or situated in the 7th from a maraka
i)	Lord of the 12th house
j)	Malefic planet in sambandha with the lord of the 12th or situated in the 12th house
k)	Lord of the 3rd or the 8th weak and afflicted
l)	Lord of the 6th or the 11th house
m)	Any malefic planet as per Parasari qualification.
The lord of the 8th house associated with a malefic planet, combining with Saturn or with the lord of the 10th house becomes a maraka if it is not situated in the 8th house; but if it also happens to be the lagna-lord then it will not act as a maraka if it occupies the 8th or the lagna. If Saturn is a functional malefic and also associates with a maraka then it becomes a very strong maraka, it will then supersede all other marakas and cause death during its own period or adverse transit.
Planets associated with the lord of the 6th, the 8th, the 12th or a marakasthana cause suffering, misery and financial strain. Planets associated with the lord of a trikabhava and also simultaneously with marakas bereft of influence of the lords of the 5th and 9th bhavas, or the lagna-lord occupying the 12th house and the lord of the 12th situated in the lagna influenced by marakas, or the lord of the lagna in the 6th house and the lord of the 6th in the lagna influenced by marakas, or the lagna or the Moon afflicted by marakas, or the lagna occupied by Ketu and the lord of the lagna situated in the 8th, or the lord of the 5th is in the 6th and the lord of the 9th is situated in the 12th house influenced by marakas, or malefic planets, other than the lords of the 9th and the 10th house, are in the lagna influenced by marakas, or the lord of the navamsa occupied by Moon or the lagna-lord is located in a trikabhava associated with a maraka, they produce poverty and intense misery, and indicate loss or destruction of wealth, and troublesome period during the course of their antra-dasha or dasha.

The dashas of marakas are important in determining the time of death but they should not always be taken to mean actual death. The dasha of a maraka not meant to cause death or the dasha of a malefic for a particular lagna not death-inflicting affects the health of a person. During the course of those dashas one may experience certain obstacles, death of someone close, change of place or of way of life and the like. The 7th house also indicates residence and long travels. The 22nd Drekkena is generally examined to ascertain the nature of death even though Varahamihira relates this drekkena with the disposal of the dead which falls on the 8th house, and is treated as an evil one. Any planet can acquire death-inflicting powers but the aspect of a strong Jupiter on the Moon, the Sun, Mars or Saturn neutralises their power to cause an early death. Jatakalankara states that if at birth the lagna-lord associated with a malefic is in a trikabhava or if the trika-lords occupy their own respective bhavas or if a malefic planet is in the lagna and the lagna-lord is weak, one suffers from acute mental and physical pressures and ailments. Sarvartha Chintamani states that the Moon in Cancer lagna aspected by Mars from the 10th and by Jupiter from the 7th while giving yoga gives a life span of sixty years only, whereas Jupiter exalted in the lagna and aspecting the two trikonas occupied by benefics makes one live for eighty years. Three or more planets situated in the 8th house not in their own or friendly or exaltation sign curtail term of life.

Timing death

The present day Hindu astrology favours the use of the Vimshottari dasha system along with the Gochara system for the purpose of prognostication and for the timing of events. The correct determination of longevity, and the timing of death is a difficult. Parasara states that the 8th house counted from the house occupied by Saturn at the time of birth is the Mrityu-bhava or the House of Death. Add up the number of Rekhas (malefic points) contributed by Saturn in the houses from the lagna to that occupied by Saturn, this figure will indicate the age at which adversity will strike the native; add up the rekhas contributed by Saturn from the house occupied by Saturn to lagna, this figure will indicate the age at which the native will suffer most severe physical adversity, and even death if so indicated by the maraka-dasha operating. Alternatively, add the number of rekhas contributed by Saturn in the houses from the house occupied by it to the Mrityu-bhava, multiply this figure by the Yoga-pinda and divide by 27 the remainder will indicate the nakshatra transiting which or the trine nakshatra therefrom Saturn will cause death, or add the number of rekhas contributed by Saturn in the houses from the house occupied by it to the Mrityu-bhava, multiply this figure by the Yoga-pinda and divide by 12 the remainder will indicate the sign or its trine that will be transited by Saturn at the time of death.

Varahamihira in his Brihat Jataka states – “Death will take place in places similar to the rasi occupied by the lord of the navamsa, in which birth falls. Further details or specialities must be described by conjunctions and planetary aspects. The time of death has to be identified by the unrisen number of navamsas in the birth. If the birth lord aspects it, the time must be doubled; aspected by benefics the time will be trebled.”

Narayanan Nambutiri, the author of Prasna Marga, who follows Varahamihira, in Chapter XXXII St.116-118 states that firstly total the bindus (before reduction) in Saturn’s Ashtakavarga from the lagna to the sign occupied by Saturn; and from the sign occupied by Saturn to the lagna, these two numbers will indicate the age when the native will be attacked by disease or misfortune; the total of these two figures also indicates the age of troubles. If the end or a beginning of a malefic dasha coincides with the age represented by these three figures, then death may take place. Multiply the Sodya Pinda of Saturn by the bindus in the 8th house from Saturn in his own Ashtakavarga, divide the product by 27; when Saturn transits the nakshatra represented by the remainder or trinal nakshatra, then death may take place. Multiply the bindus in the sign occupied by Jupiter or the Sun in Saturn’s Ashtakavarga by Saturn’s Sodya Pinda and divide the product by 12, the remainder will be the sign transited by Jupiter or the Sun respectively at the time of death.

References

Technical factors of Hindu astrology